April's Shower is a 2003 romantic comedy film directed by and starring Trish Doolan. The film also stars Maria Cina and Randall Batinkoff. Doolan also served as writer, producer, and director for the film. The film was actually released as early as 2003 at the Hamburg Gay and Lesbian Film Festival and was subsequently released at other gay-themed film festivals in cities around the world, including San Francisco, Charlotte, Copenhagen, Tampa, Detroit, Rochester, and Dallas. The film gained wide but limited release in January 2006.

Premise
A group of people are gathered for a wedding shower for April. At first, it seems to be a normal gathering for such an occasion but, as time goes on, secrets and stories begin to be revealed. Alex (Doolan) is a chef and a maid of honor at April's wedding. She ultimately reveals her true feelings which ends up taking an effect on everybody at the shower.

Cast
 Trish Doolan as Alex
 Maria Cina as April
 Joe Tabbanella as Jake
 Denise Miller as Vicki
 Zack Ward as August
 Samantha Lemole as Rita
 Molly Cheek as Franny
 Victoria Reiniger as Mary Beth
 Euan Macdonald as Fergus
 Lara Harris as Kelly
 Delaina Mitchell as Spring Dawn
 Jane Booke as Devin
 Randall Batinkoff as Pauly
 Frank Grillo as Rocco
 Honey Labrador as Sasha
 Arly Jover as Sophie
 Gizelle D'Cole as Roxy
 Pamela Salem as Anna
 Precious Chong as Cake Girl
 Jeffrey Gorman as Torth
 Raymond O'Connor as Ted Burns
 Steve Portigiani as Billy
 John Hardison as Blake

Reception
In a review for Out, Justin W. Ravitz said that the film was drowned by histrionics and featured characters with "sitcom personalities". Referring to the storyline of a lesbian leaving her girlfriend for a heterosexual lifestyle, he said that the film was "almost as insufferable as the real thing."

References

External links
 

2003 romantic comedy films
2003 films
American LGBT-related films
American romantic comedy films
2000s English-language films
Here TV original programming
Lesbian-related films
2003 LGBT-related films
2000s American films